PT. Pahala Kencana (established in Kudus, Central Java, 1976) is a transportation service company based in North Jakarta, Indonesia.

History 
Pahala Kencana started its business in 1976 serving from Jakarta to Kudus and Solo – Jakarta, vice versa. The dynamic situation of the business movement spurred Pahala Kencana to continue to expand its marketing operations area to reach several large and small cities in Sumatra, Java, Madura, Bali, and Lombok. In 1993, the Pahala Kencana Depository Services business was developed, which initially only served available operating destinations, relying on remaining luggage space, with a few smaller vehicles as modes for the "last mile" delivery. In the same year, PT BPW Pahala Kencana Travel Bureau which later became better known as Pahala Tours & Travel was established. In 1997, PK operated a number of city buses in Jakarta, and in 1998 Pahala Kencana resumed business by opening inter-city routes within the province (AKDP).

In 2000, PT Pahala Kencana began to expand into the field of tourism transportation which included the provision of tourism buses and rental vehicles under the Nirwana Luxury Tourist Bus brand. In the same year, Pahala Kencana moved its headquarters from Kudus, Central Java to Jakarta. Then in 2005, PT Pahala Kencana developed an airplane ticket sales business that concentrated on selling airline tickets at low rates by establishing PT Nata Tours.

Intercity Services 
Pahala Kencana operates Intercity bus routes.

Routes 

Pahala Kencana currently serves more than 93 cities in Java, Bali, Sumatra with the frequency of the main route commuting 86 times. Some routes include:
 Jakarta – Sumenep 
 Jakarta – Ponorogo 
 Jakarta – Wonogiri 
 Jakarta – Yogyakarta 
 Jakarta – Banyuwangi 
 Jakarta – Palembang 
 Jakarta – Wonosobo 
 Bandung – Bandarlampung 
 Bandung – Denpasar 
 Bandung – Palembang 
 Bandung – Solo 
 Bandung – Surabaya 
 Bandung – Blitar 
 Palembang – Solo 
 Semarang – Denpasar 
 Malang – Denpasar 
 Surabaya – Jakarta 
 Denpasar – Sumenep 
 Denpasar – Yogyakarta 

Nb: All routes are operated vice versa

Class 
 Executive
The executive class has comfortable chair facilities with spacious rooms, audio-visual equipment, toilets, meals and snacks
 VIP
VIP class has comfortable chair facilities, audio-visual equipment, toilets, meals and snacks
 Business
Business class has comfortable chair facilities with wide spaces, audio-visual equipment, toilets

City Bus Services 

In January 2018, Pahala Kencana started to operate buses for TransJakarta. Pahala Kencana currently operates 15 Mercedes-Benz buses bodied by Laksana carroseries with the Cityline 2 body, as most for TransJakarta buses.

Fleet

 Hino
 Mercedes-Benz

References

Bus companies of Indonesia